Albalate is the name of several towns in Spain:

 Albalate del Arzobispo, in the province of Teruel, Aragón
 Albalate de Cinca, in the province of Huesca, Aragón
 Albalate de las Nogueras, in the province of Cuenca, Castile-La Mancha
 Albalate de Zorita, in the province of Guadalajara, Castile-La Mancha